Bhiyaon or Bhiaon is a village block in Jalalpur, Ambedkar Nagar district of Uttar Pradesh State, India. It belongs to Ayodhya Division (formerly Faizabad Division). It is located 39 km towards the east from the district headquarters Akbarpur, Ambedkar Nagar and 230 km from the state capital. The Great Sufi of Chishti order and Disciple of Hazrat Baba Fareeduddin Ganj-e-Shakar R.A. Data Ganj-e-Shifa Bakhsh Hazrat Khwaja Syed Mir Masood Behdani's (commonly known as Mira Baba) 800 years old khanqah/dargah is 
Situated here, its an historical and spiritual place, Hazrat Khwaja Mir is Descendant of Imam Jafar Sadiq Bin Imam Mohammed Baqir Bin Imam Zainul Abdin Bin Hazrat Maula Imam Hussein AlaihasSalam.
People visit this holy place across the world. His annual urs held in Islamic month of Moharram on 23,24,25 every year.

Demographics
According to the 2011 census Bhiyaon has a population of 208,260.
Total Population : 208,260
Males Population : 104,244
Female Population : 104,016
 Sex-Ratio : 998
Average literacy rate of 70.52%
Male literacy : 81.77%
Female literacy : 59.42%
13% of the population is under 6 years of age.

See also
 Ambedkar Nagar
 Akbarpur, Ambedkar Nagar
 Akbarpur Railway Station
 Akbarpur Airport

References 

Cities and towns in Ambedkar Nagar district